Diaper fetishism, nappy fetishism , diaperism or AB/DL, is a type of garment fetish or paraphilic infantilism. A person with a diaper fetish derives pleasure from the diaper and/or use of it. Being forced to wear diapers as a form of humiliation was sometimes a behavior encountered in sexual masochism according to the DSM-IV, but any reference to diaper fetishism has been removed in the DSM-5.

As of September 2015, Huffington Post Arts & Culture published an interview on diaper fetishes. While this clothing fetish is obscure, diaper fetishists engage in the behavior privately or with a partner who shares a mutual interest in the fetish (sexual acts).

Behavior and attraction

General

Diaper lovers vary widely in their focus of attention.  There is no singular or archetypical behavior; therefore, a wide range of thought patterns and behaviors exist, but all tend to be a harmless and efficacious release from some kind of pressure.

While wearing diapers, a diaper fetishist generally experiences a comforting feeling. For other diaper fetishists, simply wearing a diaper, the bulky feeling and crinkly noise associated with it, is enough to cause the fetishist a form of erotic pleasure or sexual arousal.

However, most practice their diaper fantasies (i.e. the wearing of diapers) in a way that would probably not be noticed by passersby on the street. Some diaper wearers wear their diapers for limited amounts of time, while others prefer to wear them on a 24-hour, seven-day schedule.

Some are aroused from "wetting" (urination) their diapers, others like "messing" (defecation) their diapers or both. Some do not use the diapers at all (beyond wearing) for arousal like masturbation, or bladder and bowel movements. Others like the squishy feeling of the gel when soaked in water or other liquids, between the legs.

Paraphilic infantilism

Diaper fetishists and diaper lovers (DLs) are often associated with adult babies (ABs), as both wear diapers, but the former do not engage in childlike behavior, while that is the distinguishing characteristic of adult babies. The majority of diaper lovers do not engage in any kind of infantile activity and are only interested in diapers. However, in certain individuals it is possible for an overlap to occur, as one can view themselves as neither exclusively an adult baby nor a diaper lover. Hence adult babies and diaper lovers collectively refer to themselves as AB/DLs. Diapers and rubber pants with baby prints are sold in adult sizes.

Rubber fetishism

Some rubber and plastic fetishists have an affinity for diapers and rubber pants. In the case of disposable diapers, this attraction would be to their crinkly plastic backing. In the case of cloth diapers, it would be towards the latex or PVC of the pants worn over them.

Omorashi

 is a primarily Japanese fetish subculture, in which participants experience arousal from having a full bladder or a sexual attraction to someone else experiencing the feeling of a full bladder. For such fetishists, climax usually coincides with the moment of relief and embarrassment experienced when the desperate individual loses bladder control. Some subsets of omorashi fandom utilize diapers, in which case it is referred to as omorashi omutsu, or less commonly, omorashi oshime, both of which translate as "to wet oneself in a diaper."

Views in South Korea 
The South Korean public often views diapers in a negative light. A disclosed Naver cafe (similar to the Yahoo! Groups service) that is devoted to diaper fetishism was closed around September 2010 as the South Korean media outlets portrayed it negatively to the general public. Another incident occurred when a South Korean girl group, Girl's Day, were accused of wearing costumes that looked like oversized diapers, dubbed diaper fashion. On June 9, 2012, Korean hip hop artist Yang Dong-geun was shown on Saturday Night Live Korea in a comical commercial spoof for adult diapers for men.

References

Diapers
Fashion-related fetishism